Trnávka is a village and municipality in the Dunajská Streda District in the Trnava Region of south-west Slovakia.

Geography
The municipality lies at an altitude of 122 metres and covers an area of 7.91 km².

History
In the 9th century, the territory of Trnávka became part of the Kingdom of Hungary. The village was first recorded in 1235. Until the end of World War I, it was part of Hungary and fell within the Somorja district of Pozsony County. After the Austro-Hungarian army disintegrated in November 1918, Czechoslovakian troops occupied the area. After the Treaty of Trianon of 1920, the village became officially part of Czechoslovakia. In November 1938, the First Vienna Award granted the area to Hungary and it was held by Hungary until 1945. After Soviet occupation in 1945, Czechoslovak administration returned and the village became officially part of Czechoslovakia in 1947.

Demography 
In 1910, the village had a population of 423, mostly Hungarians. According to the 2001 census, the recorded population of the village was 428. As of 2001, 81.31% of its population was Hungarian while 16.82% was Slovak. Roman Catholicism is the majority religion of the village, its adherents numbering 82.01% of the total population.

Twinnings
The village is twinned with:
 Feketeerdő, Hungary

References

External links
Csallóköz-Mátyusföld Regional Association, Alliance for Common Goals 

Villages and municipalities in Dunajská Streda District
Hungarian communities in Slovakia